Leroy Labylle (born 11 March 1991) is a Belgian professional footballer who plays as a left-back for Eerste Divisie club MVV.

Born in Liège, Labylle made his first professional appearance for Genk in 2010. A spell with Standard Liège followed, but he made his breakthrough as part of MVV. His performances earned him a transfer to Eredivisie club PEC Zwolle, where he was part of a team winning the KNVB Cup and Johan Cruyff Shield in 2014. He returned to MVV in 2015, before having stints with VVV-Venlo and NEC. Labylle returned to Belgium in 2019, signing with Seraing. He won two promotions with the club, reaching the Belgian Pro League, before rejoining MVV for his third spell with the club in 2021.

Labylle is a Belgium youth international, having represented his country at under-16, under-17 and under-21 levels.

Career

Genk
Labylle made his professional debut for Genk on 18 September 2010, replacing Dugary Ndabashinze in the 78th minute of a 3–1 Belgian First Division A victory against Lokeren. He made three appearances for the club.

Standard Liège
On 27 January 2011, Labylle joined hometown club Standard Liège. He made his debut for the club on 6 February 2011, coming on as a substitute in the 94th minute for Réginal Goreux in a 1–0 league win over Eupen. One week later, in a 2–0 loss to his former club Genk, Labylle came off the bench for Henri Eninful in the 67th minute. These remained his only appearances for Standard. He featured as an unused substitute in the club's UEFA Europa League game against Helsingborgs IF on 18 August 2011.

MVV
On 31 January 2012, Labylle was sent on loan to MVV. He made his first appearance for the club on 17 February, replacing Lance Voorjans in the 61st minute of a 1–1 away draw against PEC Zwolle in the Eerste Divisie. On 27 February, he scored his first professional goal in a 6–0 beatdown of Emmen. He moved to permanently MVV in the summer of 2012.

PEC Zwolle
On 2 September 2013, Labylle signed a three-year contract with Eredivisie club PEC Zwolle, where he was set to replace Youness Mokhtar who had left for Twente. He made his debut on 14 September in a 2–1 league loss to Ajax, replacing Maikel van der Werff in the 79th minute.

Labylle was part of PEC's team which won the KNVB Cup and Johan Cruyff Shield in 2014, albeit his contributions on the pitch were limited: he made nine total appearances for the club in two years.

Return to MVV
Labylle was sent on a six-month loan to his former club MVV on 2 February 2015. Upon his return, his contract with PEC was terminated by mutual consent. One day later, on 8 July 2015, he signed a one-year contract with MVV.

Labylle suffered a tibia fracture in a derby against Fortuna Sittard on 30 November 2015, leaving him sidelined for an extended period. After a long rehabilitation period, he nevertheless rejoined MVV's squad on an amateur contract for the 2016–17 season. He soon reconquered a spot in the starting line-up and signed a new one-and-a-half-year contract with MVV on 23 January 2017.

VVV-Venlo
Despite an ongoing contract, Labylle left MVV again at the end of the season, signing a two-year contract with Eredivisie club VVV-Venlo. In Venlo he failed to secure a starting spot at left-back, as head coach Maurice Steijn mainly preferred Roel Janssen at the position.

NEC
On 2 August 2018, Labylle signed a three-year contract with NEC. On 17 August, he made his debut for the club in the first matchday of the season, starting at left-back in a 2–2 home draw against Cambuur. Labylle was a starter the entire season, making 41 total appearances.

Seraing
On 22 July 2019, Labylle's contract with NEC was terminated by mutual consent. One day later, Labylle joined Seraing competing in the third-tier Belgian First Amateur Division. This marked his first return to his native Belgium after seven years.

He was part of the team winning two promotions in a row, reaching the top level Belgian Pro League in 2021.

Third spell at MVV
Labylle returned to MVV on 9 August 2021, signing a two-year contract with the option for an additional season. He made his comeback for the club in a 1–0 away win over Jong FC Utrecht on the same day as signing, replacing Kai-David Bösing the 61st minute.

International career
Labylle is a Belgium youth international, having represented his country at under-16 and under-17 levels. On 24 March 2011, Labylle made his debut for Belgium under-21 in a friendly against Scotland, playing alongside the likes of Kevin De Bruyne, Thibaut Courtois and Christian Benteke in a 1–0 win.

Personal life
Labylle dated Miss Belgium 2013, Noémie Happart, until 2014. She would later go on to marry fellow footballer Yannick Carrasco.

Career statistics

Club

Honours
Genk
 Belgian Pro League: 2010–11

PEC Zwolle
 KNVB Cup: 2013–14
 Johan Cruyff Shield: 2014

References

External links
 
 

1991 births
Living people
Association football fullbacks
Belgian Pro League players
Belgian Third Division players
Belgian expatriate footballers
Belgian expatriate sportspeople in the Netherlands
Belgian footballers
Belgium under-21 international footballers
Belgium youth international footballers
Eerste Divisie players
Eredivisie players
Expatriate footballers in the Netherlands
Footballers from Liège
K.R.C. Genk players
MVV Maastricht players
NEC Nijmegen players
PEC Zwolle players
R.F.C. Seraing (1922) players
Standard Liège players
VVV-Venlo players